Capitol station is a light rail station operated by Santa Clara Valley Transportation Authority (VTA). Capitol station is served by the Blue Line of the VTA Light Rail system. The Capitol is located in the median of State Route 87, near the intersection with Capitol Expressway in San Jose, California.

Connecting transit 
 VTA Bus: , 

The station is also served by VTA's special service to home games of the San Francisco 49ers at Levi's Stadium.

See also 
 Capitol station (disambiguation) – other train stations with similar names

References

External links 

Santa Clara Valley Transportation Authority light rail stations
Santa Clara Valley Transportation Authority bus stations
Railway stations in San Jose, California
1987 establishments in California
Railway stations in the United States opened in 1987
Railway stations in highway medians